Damnamenia is a genus of flowering plants in the family Asteraceae.

The only known species is Damnamenia vernicosa, called the black-eyed daisy. It is endemic to New Zealand (Auckland and Campbell Islands).

Description
Damnamenia vernicosa is a small, perennial, stoloniferous herb.  It has glossy green leaves and white daisy flowers with dark purple centres.  The plant flowers from November to January and fruits from December to March.

Distribution and habitat
The plant is endemic to New Zealand’s subantarctic Auckland and Campbell Islands.  Its preferred habitats are upland cushion bogs and Pleurophyllum-dominated herbfields.  It also grows at lower elevations in exposed and sparsely vegetated sites.

Taxonomy & naming
It was first described in 1844 as Celmisia vernicosa by Joseph Hooker. In 2012, David Given separated C. vernicosa from Celmisia and from related genera on the basis of its morphology, and allocated it to the new genus, Damnamenia. Given named the genus Damnamenia for the Dactyl, Damnamenius, since Celmisia was named for Celmis, another Dactyl. The specific epithet, vernicosa, is the Latin adjective, vernicosus,-a, -um, meaning "varnished", and refers to the apparently varnished leaves.

Conservation status
The species is listed as "At Risk - Naturally Uncommon" on the most recent (2018) New Zealand Threatened Classification for plants, because of its restricted range).

References

Astereae
Monotypic Asteraceae genera
Endemic flora of New Zealand
Flora of the Auckland Islands
Flora of the Campbell Islands
Plants described in 1844